Bruno Antonio dos Santos (born 13 June 1995), known as Bruno Santos, is a Brazilian footballer who last played for União Rondonópolis as a right back.

Club career
Born in Jaraguá do Sul, Santa Catarina, Bruno Santos finished his formation with Figueirense. On 6 December 2014 he made his first team – and Série A – debut, coming on as a late substitute for fellow youth graduate Yago in a 1–2 home loss against Internacional.

On 30 December, Bruno Santos was definitely promoted to the main squad in the following year. He failed to appear in a single match subsequently, and was released in the end of 2016 after a loan stint at Metropolitano.

On 2 January 2017, Bruno Santos was announced at Portuguesa.

References

External links
Figueirense official profile 

Bruno Santos at ZeroZero

1995 births
Living people
Sportspeople from Santa Catarina (state)
Brazilian footballers
Association football defenders
Campeonato Brasileiro Série A players
Campeonato Brasileiro Série D players
Figueirense FC players
Clube Atlético Metropolitano players
Associação Portuguesa de Desportos players
Batatais Futebol Clube players
Clube Náutico Marcílio Dias players
União Esporte Clube players